Grange Hockey Club is one of four sections of The Grange Club situated at Portgower Place in Edinburgh.  The three other sports that can be enjoyed through the parent club are Cricket, Squash and Tennis.

Grange Hockey Club, originally Edinburgh Northern Hockey Club, was formed in April 1905 and was one of the early hockey clubs in Scotland. The club first started playing at Raeburn Place in 1928 and changed its name to Grange Hockey Club in 1972.

With 8 men's teams, 4 ladies teams, veterans and active youth section the Grange Hockey Club is one of the largest in Scotland.

The Grange Hockey Club recently celebrated its centenary year, celebrating the 100th year of hockey being played under the Grange name since Edinburgh Northern Hockey Club amalgamated with Grange cricket club to form the modern hockey section of the club.  The Grange home kit is white shirts with blue shorts and blue socks.

The Men's Teams 

The 1st XI is one of the best sides in the country and regularly supplies players to the Scotland national side. They are the current Scottish League Champions. Scottish Cup Winners, and EuroHockey Trophy Champions. 

The 1st XI have won the Scottish Cup twice in a row in 2014 and 2015 and most recently in 2018.

Playing in the national 1st divisions, the team continue to enjoy great success, both domestically and in European competition.  

Grange 2nd XI are usually frontrunners in Regional Central League 1, the highest division in which a club 2nd XI are permitted to play by the sport’s governing body. This team provides an excellent platform for young talent in the club to flourish before entering the top level in Scottish Hockey.

Grange 3rd XI play in Regional Central League 1 as well. The 3s team is an experienced side with many 'Scottish Masters' representative. They hope to remain competitive in this division giving the Grange 2's and other second teams a run for their money. 

Grange Development team(s) were established to allow younger players the opportunity to become involved in men’s senior hockey under the guidance of a host of more experienced, high calibre and ex-international players. Grange Development team have been a permanent fixture of East District League 1 for a number of years.

Grange 5,  7 and 8th XIs play in East District Leagues 1, 2 and 4 respectively, acting as a development base for new or inexperienced players, and providing an opportunity for those that seek more enjoyment than
competitive edge from their hockey. 

In addition, Grange Hockey Club has an Youth section Under 18 membership of some 160 youngsters between the ages of nine and fifteen, both boys and girls, fielding teams at U18, U16, U14 and U12.

Grange Under 16 teams compete in National Leagues while the Under 14 teams take part in a local League for that age group. In recent years Grange have had representatives in the Scotland Boys Under 18 and Scotland Boys and Girls Under 16 Squads, in addition to several representatives in District Squads at both age groups.

Grange Edinburgh Ladies 
There are four teams and indoor teams.

Training 

Training for men at all skill levels takes place every Tuesday at St George's Girls School from 7pm till 9pm and is coached by 2 skilled and experienced club members.

Training for the men's 1st and 2nd XI takes place at Fettes College pitches on Tuesdays and Thursdays from 7pm till 9pm and is a professional set up with three coaches to develop the elite in the club.

Social aspects 

The club has a thriving social scene, with a unique clubhouse in the centre of Edinburgh. Most Saturdays it is filled with players, officials and spectators enjoying after match teas. 

The club holds Men's and Ladies Hockey Dinner events, which usually takes place in mid to late March.

The club hosts an annual Easter Festival. This is a long weekend of mixed grass hockey enjoyed by all age groups, there are a variety of activities during the day and in the evening. It is the largest Easter Hockey Festival in Edinburgh hosting 10-12 teams annuals. 

The Club hosts a fireworks night in early November. This is a great event for both members' and local families to enjoy watching a fireworks display from the terrace.

The Grange field a mixed summer hockey team the 'Lone Grangers', all players welcome.

Notable players

Men's internationals

 Robert Barr
 Donny Hay
 Michael Leonard

 Michael Watt

References

Sports teams in Edinburgh
Scottish field hockey clubs
1905 establishments in Scotland
Field hockey clubs established in 1905